Christian Siemund (born 21 September 1985) is a German footballer who plays for Berliner AK.

External links

1985 births
Living people
German footballers
Eisenhüttenstädter FC Stahl players
FC Erzgebirge Aue players
Berliner AK 07 players
3. Liga players
Association football midfielders
Sportspeople from Eisenhüttenstadt
Footballers from Brandenburg